Joseph Price is a college basketball coach at Central State University. Prior to his arrival at Central State, he served as the head coach of Grambling State University.

Playing career
Price played college basketball for Notre Dame under Digger Phelps in the 1980s. He later played professionally overseas for 13 years.

IUPUI
Price began his college coaching career at IUPUI in 2002–03, that same year, the Jaguars advance to the NCAA Tournament for the first time ever. While at IUPUI, Price coached current Indiana Pacers point guard George Hill, a first round selection in the 2008 NBA Draft.

Lamar
In the 2011-2012 season, Price helped coach the Cardinals to an outstanding 23-12 record and a spot in the NCAA Tournament for the first time since 2000. It was the team's first 20-win season since 1988 and their third highest win total ever.

Grambling State
In 2012, Price was hired as the head coach of Grambling State. His first season was not successful, as the 2012-13 team went 0–28, becoming just the eighth Division I team in NCAA history to finish a season winless.

Central State

Price was hired to lead the Marauders of Central State in the summer of 2014. In his first season at CSU, the team contended for the Great Midwest Athletic Conference championship and finished with an 18-12 overall mark. The 18 wins was the most by any first year Central State coach in over 60 years.

Head coaching record

References

Living people
American expatriate basketball people in Belgium
American expatriate basketball people in France
American expatriate basketball people in Germany
American expatriate basketball people in Italy
American expatriate basketball people in Spain
American expatriate basketball people in Switzerland
American men's basketball coaches
American men's basketball players
Ball State Cardinals men's basketball coaches
Basketball coaches from Indiana
Basketball players from Indiana
College men's basketball head coaches in the United States
Grambling State Tigers men's basketball coaches
High school basketball coaches in the United States
IUPUI Jaguars men's basketball coaches
Lamar Cardinals basketball coaches
Morehead State Eagles men's basketball coaches
Notre Dame Fighting Irish men's basketball players
People from Marion, Indiana
Washington Bullets draft picks
Year of birth missing (living people)